Music hall songs were sung in the music halls by a variety of artistes. Most of them were comic in nature. There are a very large number of music hall songs, and most of them have been forgotten. In London between 1900 and 1910, a single publishing company, Francis, Day and Hunter, published between forty and fifty songs a month.

Examples
They number in their tens of thousands and include the following:

"After the Ball" (Charles K. Harris)
"The Army of Today's All Right"
"Any Old Iron" (music by Charles Collins; lyrics by Terry Sheppard) sung by Harry Champion.
"Boiled Beef and Carrots" (Charles Collins and Fred Murray) sung by Harry Champion.
"The Boy I Love is up in the Gallery" (George Ware) sung by Nelly Power and Marie Lloyd.
"Burlington Bertie from Bow" (William Hargreaves) sung by Ella Shields.
"Daddy Wouldn't Buy Me a Bow Wow" (Joseph Tabrar) sung by Vesta Victoria.
"Daisy Bell" (Harry Dacre) sung by Katie Lawrence.
"Don't Dilly Dally on the Way" (Charles Collins and Fred W. Leigh) sung by Marie Lloyd.
"Down at the Old Bull and Bush" (music by Harry von Tilzer; lyrics by Andrew B. Sterling) sung by Florrie Forde.
"Goodbye, Dolly Gray" (Paul Barnes; Will. D. Cobb) sung by George Lashwood.
"Has Anybody Here Seen Kelly?" (C.W. Murphy and Will Letters) sung by Florrie Ford.
"Hello, Hello, Who's Your Lady Friend?" (music by Harry Fragson; lyrics by Worton David and Bert Lee) sung by Mark Sheridan.
"Hold Your Hand Out, Naughty Boy" (C.W. Murphy and Will Letters) sung by Florrie Ford.
"I'm Henery the Eighth, I Am" (1911) (Fred Murray and Bert Weston) sung by Harry Champion.
"The Honeysuckle and the Bee"
"I Do Like to Be Beside the Seaside" sung by various people including Mark Sheridan and Florrie Forde.
"I Live in Trafalgar Square" (C.W. Murphy) sung by Morny Cash.
"If It Wasn't For The 'Ouses In Between" (music by George Le Brunn; lyrics by Edgar Bateman) sung by Gus Elen.
"If You Want to Know the Time, Ask a Policeman" (Edward Rogers and Augustus Durandeau) sung by James Fawn.
"It's a Bit of a Ruin That Cromwell Knocked About a Bit" (Harry Bedford; Terry Sullivan) sung by Marie Lloyd.
"It's a Long Way to Tipperary" (1914) (Jack Judge and Harry Williams) sung by Florrie Forde.
"Knees Up Mother Brown" a song, published in 1938, by which time it had already been known for some years.
"Let's All Go Down the Strand" (Harry Castling and C.W. Murphy) sung by Charles R. Whittle.
"Maybe It's Because I'm a Londoner" (Hubert Gregg)
"Nellie Dean" (Henry W. Armstrong) sung by Gertie Gitana.
"Oh! It's a lovely war" sung by Ella Shields.
"Oh! Mr Porter" (music by George Le Brunn; lyrics by Thomas Le Brunn) sung by Marie Lloyd.
 "Proper Cup of Coffee"
"She Was A Sweet Little Dicky Bird"
"Ship Ahoy! (All the Nice Girls Love a Sailor)", performed by Hetty King
"Ta-ra-ra-boom-de-ay" (Harry J. Sayers) sung by Lottie Collins.
"The Man Who Broke the Bank at Monte Carlo" (Fred Gilbert) sung by Charles Coborn.
"To Be There" (1886) (written by C.A. Page ; composed by J. Iliffe.) sung by Sam Torr.
"Waiting At The Church" (Henry E. Pether; Fred W. Leigh) sung by Vesta Victoria.
"We're Going to Hang out the Washing on the Siegfried Line" by Jimmy Kennedy was first published in 1939
"When Father Papered the Parlour" (Weston and Barnes) sung by Billy Williams.
"Where Did You Get That Hat?" (James Rolmaz) sung by J.C Heffron.
"Your Baby Has Gone Down The Plughole" (also known as "A Mother's Lament" and "The Angels' Reply") (writer unknown), later covered by Cream

Bawdy examples
Many of the following burlesque songs, which were written before the First World War, continue to be sung today in certain British Rugby Football clubs.
"Christmas Day In The Cookhouse"
"Dinah, Dinah Show Us Your Leg"
"Good Ship Venus"
"It's Hard to Say I Love You"
"Ivan Skavinsky Skavar"
"My Father's a Lavatory Cleaner"
"Old Dan Tucker"
"Parlez Vous"
"The Great Big Wheel" a.k.a. the "Engineer's Song"
"The Moon Shines Bright on Charlie Chaplin"
"The Gentleman Soldier"

References
Peter Gammond (1973) Your Own, Your Very Own!: A Music Hall Scrapbook. London: Ian Allan,

Notes

 
Music hall